MPCC can refer to:
Military Planning and Conduct Capability, the operational headquarters of European Union military operations 
Mouvement pour un cyclisme crédible, an organisation of professional cycling teams
Military Police Complaints Commission, a Canadian body
Maharashtra Pradesh Congress Committee, an Indian political party in Maharashtra
Madhya Pradesh Congress Committee, an Indian political party in Madhya Pradesh
Manipur Pradesh Congress Committee, an Indian political party in Manipur
Mizoram Pradesh Congress Committee, an Indian political party in Mizoram
Meghalaya Pradesh Congress Committee, an Indian political party in Meghalaya
Mysore Pradesh Congress Committee, an Indian political party in Mysore State (now Karnataka) and renamed as Karnataka Pradesh Congress Committee